In geometry, the great rhombihexahedron (or great rhombicube) is a nonconvex uniform polyhedron, indexed as U21. It has 18 faces (12 squares and 6 octagrams), 48 edges, and 24 vertices. Its dual is the great rhombihexacron.  Its vertex figure is a crossed quadrilateral.

Orthogonal projections

Gallery

Related polyhedra 

It shares the vertex arrangement with the convex truncated cube. It additionally shares its edge arrangement with the nonconvex great rhombicuboctahedron (having 12 square faces in common), and with the great cubicuboctahedron (having the octagrammic faces in common).

It may be constructed as the exclusive or (blend) of three octagrammic prisms. Similarly, the small rhombihexahedron may be constructed as the exclusive or of three octagonal prisms.

Great rhombihexacron 

The great rhombihexacron is a nonconvex isohedral polyhedron. It is the dual of the uniform great rhombihexahedron (U21). It has 24 identical bow-tie-shaped faces, 18 vertices, and 48 edges.

It has 12 outer vertices which have the same vertex arrangement as the cuboctahedron, and 6 inner vertices with the vertex arrangement of an octahedron.

As a surface geometry, it can be seen as visually similar to a Catalan solid, the disdyakis dodecahedron, with much taller rhombus-based pyramids joined to each face of a rhombic dodecahedron.

See also 
 List of uniform polyhedra

References

 uniform polyhedra and duals

External links 
 

Uniform polyhedra